Doctor of Canon Law (JCD) is the doctoral-level terminal degree in the studies of canon law of the Roman Catholic Church.  It can also be an honorary degree awarded by Anglican colleges. It may also be abbreviated ICD or dr.iur.can. (Iuris Canonici Doctor), ICDr, DCL, DCnl, DDC, or DCanL (Doctor of Canon Law). A doctor of both laws (i.e. canon and civil) is a JUD (Juris Utriusque Doctor) or UJD (Utriusque Juris Doctor).

Course of study
A doctorate in canon law normally requires earning the degree Licentiate of Canon Law, then at least two years of additional study and the development and defence of an original dissertation that contributes to the development of canon law. Only a pontifical university or ecclesiastical faculties of canon law may grant the doctorate or licentiate in canon law.

The Licentiate of Canon Law is a three-year degree. The prerequisite for it is normally the graduate-level Bachelor of Sacred Theology (STB) degree, a Master of Divinity (M.Div.) degree, or a Master of Arts (MA) degree in Roman Catholic theology.

While not a civil law degree, the doctor of canon law is in some ways comparable to the Doctor of Juridical Science (JSD) or doctor of laws (LLD) in terms of the nature of study, as they are terminal academic research degrees as opposed to professional degrees.

Ecclesiastical office prerequisite
Members of the Supreme Tribunal of the Apostolic Signatura, Auditors of the Tribunal of the Roman Rota, judicial vicars, ecclesiastical judges, defenders of the bond, and promoters of justice, must possess either a doctorate or licence in canon law.  Either of the degrees is recommended for those who serve as vicar general or episcopal vicar in a diocese.  Candidates for bishop must either possess the doctorate in canon law or the doctorate in sacred theology or be truly expert in one of those fields. Canonical advocates must possess the doctorate or be truly expert.

History

The Roman Church has the oldest continuously used homogeneous legal system in the world. Following the Gregorian Reform's emphasis on canon law, bishops formed cathedral schools to train the clergy in canon law.  Consequently, many of the medieval universities of Europe founded faculties of canon law (e.g., Cambridge and Oxford).  Since the Protestant Reformation, however, they became limited to those universities which retained Catholic faculties (e.g., Pontifical Lateran University, Pontifical University of St. Thomas Aquinas (Angelicum), Gregorian University, Catholic University of Louvain, Faculty of Canon Law "S. Pio X" in Venice). Other Catholic universities with ecclesiastical faculties in canon law were subsequently given the ability to grant the degree (e.g., the Catholic University of America School of Canon Law, University of Saint Paul). The University of Santo Tomas in Manila, Philippines, has been awarding the degree since 1734.

Noted Doctors of Canon Law
Lorenzo Antonetti, President Emeritus of the Administration of the Patrimony of the Apostolic See
Antonio Arregui Yarza, Metropolitan Archbishop of the Roman Catholic Archdiocese of Guayaquil, Ecuador; awarded a Doctorate in Canon Law by the Pontifical University of St. Thomas Aquinas (Angelicum)
Carlos Azpiroz Costa, former Master of the Order of Preachers; awarded a Doctorate in Canon Law by the Pontifical University of St. Thomas Aquinas (Angelicum)
Pope Benedict XV, pope
Tarcisio Bertone, Cardinal Secretary of State Emeritus
Anthony Bevilacqua, cardinal, Archbishop Emeritus of Philadelphia, United States
Alberto Bovone, cardinal, Prefect-Emeritus of the Congregation for the Causes of Saints; awarded a Doctorate in Canon Law by the Pontifical University of St. Thomas Aquinas (Angelicum)
Seán Brady, Cardinal Archbishop of Armagh, Ireland
Raymond Leo Burke, Cardinal Prefect - Emeritus of the Apostolic Signatura, Archbishop Emeritus of Saint Louis, Missouri, and Bishop Emeritus of La Crosse, Wisconsin, United States
Carlo Caffarra, cardinal, Archbishop Emeritus of Bologna, Italy
Darío Castrillón Hoyos, cardinal, President Emeritus of the Pontifical Commission Ecclesia Dei
Nicolaus Copernicus, mathematician and astronomer of the Renaissance, formulated a heliocentric model of the universe; received degree 31 May 1503 (Jure Canonico ... et doctoratus)
Kevin John Dunn, Bishop of Hexham and Newcastle, England; awarded a Doctorate in Canon Law by the Pontifical University of St. Thomas Aquinas (Angelicum)
Edward Egan, cardinal, Archbishop Emeritus of New York, United States
Angelo Felici, President Emeritus of the Pontifical Commission Ecclesia Dei
Georg Gänswein, Archbishop, Prefect of the Papal Household, private secretary to Pope-Emeritus Benedict XVI
Pietro Gasparri, cardinal, Holy See Secretary of State, codifier of the 1917 Code of Canon Law
Bruno Heim, late Titular Archbishop of Xanthus, Apostolic Nuncio Emeritus to Great Britain, prominent armorist of twentieth-century ecclesiastical heraldry
Julián Herranz Casado, cardinal, President Emeritus of the Pontifical Council for the Interpretation of Legislative Texts; awarded a Doctorate in Canon Law by the Pontifical University of St. Thomas Aquinas (Angelicum)
William Keeler, Archbishop Emeritus of Baltimore, United States
Thomas C. Kelly, Archbishop Emeritus of Louisville, Kentucky, United States; awarded a Doctorate in Canon Law by the Pontifical University of St. Thomas Aquinas (Angelicum)
Giuseppe Lazzarotto, Apostolic Nuncio to Australia
Jerome Edward Listecki, Archbishop of Milwaukee, Wisconsin, and formerly Bishop of La Crosse, Wisconsin; Auxiliary Bishop of the Roman Catholic Archdiocese of Chicago, Illinois, United States; awarded a Doctorate in Canon Law by the Pontifical University of St. Thomas Aquinas (Angelicum)
William Lyndwood, English Bishop of St Davids, diplomat and canonist, most notable for the publisher of The Provinciale
Mary McAleese, President of Ireland 1997 - 2011
Edward A. McCarthy, Archbishop Emeritus of Miami, Florida, and namesake of Archbishop Edward A. McCarthy High School in Ft. Lauderdale, Florida, United States
Celestino Migliore, archbishop, Apostolic Nuncio to Poland and formerly the Apostolic Nuncio and Permanent Observer, Permanent Observer Mission of the Holy See to the United Nations
Gerald Moverley, Bishop Emeritus of Hallam, England; awarded a Doctorate in Canon Law by the Pontifical University of St. Thomas Aquinas (Angelicum)
David M. O'Connell, Bishop of Trenton, New Jersey, United States, and President Emeritus of the Catholic University of America; awarded a Doctorate in Canon Law from the Catholic University of America
Silvio Oddi, cardinal, Prefect Emeritus of the Congregation for the Clergy; awarded a Doctorate in Canon Law by the Pontifical University of St. Thomas Aquinas (Angelicum)
Thomas Paprocki, Bishop of Springfield, Illinois, United States
Pope Paul VI, pope; awarded Doctorate in Canon Law from the University of Milan
Peter Smith, Metropolitan Archbishop of the Roman Catholic Archdiocese of Cardiff, Wales; awarded a Doctorate in Canon Law by the Pontifical University of St. Thomas Aquinas (Angelicum)
Edward N. Peters, referendary of the Apostolic Signatura; awarded a Doctorate in Canon Law by the Catholic University of America School of Canon Law in 1991
Francisco Polti Santillan, Bishop of Santiago del Estero, Argentina
Giovanni Battista Re, Dean of the College of Cardinals
Angelo Sodano, Emeritus Dean of the College of Cardinals
Jean-Louis Tauran, cardinal, former President of the Pontifical Council for Interreligious Dialogue
Rik Torfs, professor of Canon Law at Catholic University of Leuven, former senator for the Christian Democratic and Flemish party in the Belgian Senate, former rector of the Catholic University of Leuven
Mar Varkey Vithayathil, cardinal, Major Archbishop of Ernakulam-Angamaly, India; awarded a Doctorate in Canon Law by the Pontifical University of St. Thomas Aquinas (Angelicum)

Footnotes

Canon Law, Doctor
Law degrees
Academic canon law

Religious degrees